Cyclophora subrubrata is a moth in the  family Geometridae. It is found on the Solomon Islands.

References

Moths described in 1905
Cyclophora (moth)
Moths of Oceania